Salif Traoré (born 15 March 1979 Abidjan, Ivory Coast), better known by his stage name A’salfo, is an Ivorian singer. He is the lead singer of the group Magic System.

Career 
Born on 15 March 1979 in Abidjan, A'salfo comes from a family of eight brothers and sisters. His father is a worker in a construction company, his mother a housewife without profession. From an early age, he preferred music to his studies under the influence of his older brother Ali, who was a guitarist.

In 1997, A'salfo became one of the founding members of the Magic System group. A group made up of: Goudé, Tino and Manadja After the success of the hit Premier Gaou (300,000 singles sold in France alone) he visited the music academy in France and became one of the tenors of African artists with a music degree. On 20 August 2012, he was appointed UNESCO Goodwill Ambassador by Irina Bokova for his messages in favor of peace.

In 2016 and 2017, he was a juror in The Voice Afrique Francophone. After moving to France in the Yvelines department in 2000, A'Salfo is gradually returning to Ivory Coast. There, with Magic System, he created the Anoumanbo Music Festival, FEMUA, which brings together African artists in the neighborhood where he grew up.

Honours 

  Officer Order of Ivory Merit

References

Ivorian singers
1979 births
Living people